Aleksander Smolar (born December 10, 1940 in Białystok) is a Polish writer, political activist and adviser, vice-president of Institute for Human Sciences and president of the Stefan Batory Foundation. He is son of prominent communist activist Grzegorz Smolar.

Biography

Between 1954 and 1957 Smolar belonged to the Polish communist youth organization Union of Polish Youth (Związek Młodzieży Polskiej) and then, until 1964, to the Union of Socialist Youth.

Smolar began his studies at the Warsaw Politechnic but soon transferred to Warsaw University to study sociology and economics. In 1962 he joined the Political Discussion Club initiated by Karol Modzelewski. He graduated in 1964.

He continued his studies, serving as a research assistant to Włodzimierz Brus in the Political Economy Department at Warsaw University. He was a member of the communist Polish United Workers' Party (PZPR) which ruled Poland and served as a vice-secretary of the committee of the party in the Political Economy Department at his school. He was removed from the party for publicly defending Leszek Kołakowski, a Polish revisionist Marxist philosopher who was critical of Marxism-Leninism.

Smolar took part in the March 1968 events, a series of protests by students and young factory workers against the repressive nature of the communist party in Poland. He was arrested and imprisoned until February 1969. He was expelled from the university and after being released from prison worked in heavy industry. In 1971 he emigrated from Poland, going to Italy, United Kingdom and France. Eventually he began working for Centre National de l Recherche Scientifique in Paris. In 1973 he began publishing a quarterly political journal Aneks, which he continued until 1990. He served as a spokesperson for the Workers' Defence Committee (Komitet Obrony Robotników) a civil society group which aided the families of workers who were being persecuted by the communist authorities. He also served as a representative of the Committee for Social Self-Defense KOR (Komitet Samoobrony Społecznej KOR) abroad.

After the fall of communism in 1989 in Poland, Smolar served as an adviser to the first non-communist prime minister of Poland, Tadeusz Mazowiecki, and then to prime minister Hanna Suchocka. He was in the leadership of the Democratic Union (Unia Demokratyczna) party, as well as the successor Freedom Union (Unia Wolności).

In 1990 he was named president of the Stefan Batory Foundation. He serves on the board of the European Council on Foreign Relations and is a vice president of the Institute for Human Sciences in Vienna.

Selected publications
Globalization, Power and Democracy. (co-edited by Marc Plattner), The Johns Hopkins University Press, Washington, 2000
Entre Kant et Kosovo. Etudes offertes à Pierre Hassner. (co-written with Anne-Marie Le Gloannec), Presses de Sciences Po, Paris 2003
Tabu i niewinność, ("Taboo and Innocence"), Universitas, Kraków 2010

See also
Politics of Poland
List of Poles

References

1940 births
People from Białystok
Living people
20th-century Polish non-fiction writers
Polish male non-fiction writers
20th-century Polish male writers
Members of the Committee for Social Self-Defense KOR